Jan Chrzciciel Henryk Witold Wołodkowicz (17 September 1765 – 6 August 1825 or 20 August 1836) was a Lithuanian nobleman from the Wołodkowicz family of the Radwan coat of arms. Initially, he served as cavalry captain in the Grand Ducal Lithuanian Army from 1789 to 1794. Joining the French Revolutionary Army in 1796, he rose to the rank of general, which he kept in the Grande Armée. He was also one of Napoleon's Aide-de-camp.

Early life 
He was the son of Minsk's Stalininkas  (born in 1730) and Regina née Broniec. Following the family's tradition, Jan assumed the land judge's office in Minsk in February 1789 or around 1790 as the Lithuanian chamberlain.

Grand Duchy of Lithuania 
During the Great Sejm, in October 1788, the combined size of the Polish and Lithuanian armies was increased to 100,000. This increase included the target numbers of 10,650 for Lithuanian cavalry. The expansion of the military's size meant that the nobility's sons had a greater chance of a military career, and thus Wołodkowicz also decided to pursue this career. On 3 March 1789, he received a captain's commission in the 4th Banner of the 1st Lithuanian National Cavalry Brigade. For unknown reasons, he left it around mid-September 1791, but the following year in the War of 1792, he was again among the brigade's captains. However, it is unknown and doubtful if he partook in the Battle of Mir. 

Thanks to this marriage with Anna Małgorzata Fergusson-Tepper, a wealthy Warsaw banker's daughter, on 29 June 1792, he increased his fortune to 150,000 Polish złoty. On 21 November 1793, he was awarded the Order of Saint Stanislaus by Stanisław August Poniatowski, but as the king had by then had joined the Targowica Confederation, this award was a dubious honor at that time.

Regardless, Wołodkowicz joined the ranks of the rebels in the Kościuszko Uprising. At the turn of May and June, being trusted by the Lithuanian insurrectional authorities, still with a captain's rank in the 1st Lithuanian National Cavalry Brigade, he carried out reconnaissance on the strategically important Vilnius-Minskas route, mainly in the vicinity of Ašmena. He led a regular cavalry unit of about 100 cavalrymen, at the head of which (or a patrol separated from it) he skirmished with a Cossack unit from General Bennigsen's group. The clash ended with a small success for the Russians, with minimal Lithuanian losses.

French Revolutionary Wars 
In 1796, Jan Henryk Wołodkowicz joined the French Revolutionary Army. From then on to 1801, he served in the Army of Italy. In 1799 and 1800, he served as a cavalry Général de brigade, serving as commander of the Army of Italy's cavalry's left wing. On 9 August 1801, at 36 years of age, he was made a reformed officer. He was a radical republican and distrustful of Napoleon.

Napoleonic Wars 
On 23 September 1806, as Général de brigade, he began organizing the 2nd Legion of the North at Nuremberg. Jan Henryk Wołodkowicz fought in the Prussian and Polish campaigns of the War of the Fourth Coalition. On 27 September 1807, he was transferred to serve the Grand Duchy of Warsaw by order of the Emperor, but after Wołodkowicz's complaints, the order was rescinded.

In 1809, during the War of the Fifth Coalition, he was a general of the French Army. 

On the 1st of July 1812, he was made Governor of Minsk with the rank of Maréchal granted by Napoléon. Member of Grande Armée during Napoleon's Invasion of Russia, he was taken prisoner and deported to Siberia by the Russians during the battle of Smolensk in 1812, in which his eldest son Joseph got killed. He spent the years from 1812 to 1814 or 1815 in Russian captivity. He was the last Général of the Grande Armée to be released.

After 1815 
After being released in 1815 he spent the rest of his life fighting legal battles in St. Petersburg, to regain his confiscated and usurped estates in Poland and Belarus. The lawsuit only ended in 1903 without success due to the implication of high ranking members of the Russian nobility who embezzled facts in front of the Tsar. The Tsar perceived the request because of the defamation as a favour instead of a legitimate request, which is the reason why he rejected it. Instead Nicholas II confirmed the old princely title and allowed the inheriting of it through the female descendants of Prince Henry. A last attempt to reclaim his ancestral holdings was made by prince Armand, one of Henry's great-grandsons, in 1920 after the formation of Poland, with the help of several Polish generals and the Radziwiłł family, but this project did not bear fruits because of the instability following the Polish-Soviet War.

Arc de Triomphe 
According to some, his name is carved on the west pillar of the Arc de Triomphe as "Henry", his surname given by Napoleon. The Wolodkowicz family tried three times to correct the name to Wolodkowicz, in 1840, in 1928 with the backing of the Polish embassy and 1980. The French government always replied that they can not alter a historic monument. Others argue it is the name of a French colonel Claude François Henry who died in 1812 in Spain during the siege of Valencia.

Private life 
He first married Anna Isabel Tepper de Ferguson, daughter of the banker Ludwig-Wilhelm Tepper de Ferguson. They had one child Joseph (officer in the French army and knight of the Légion d'honneur) and divorced in 1804. In 1805 he married Marie Thérèse Lasserey, daughter of Jacques Ambroise Lasserey. They also had one child, Prince Alexander Henryk, French Henri Alexandre (Knight of the Légion d'honneur). Henry got granted the title of count by Napoleon I.

References

Sources

External links
Andrzej Malejka, Wołodkowicz Jan Chrzciciel Henryk (1765-1825) (pol.)
Henry, Claude François (fr.)

1765 births
1825 deaths
18th-century Lithuanian nobility
19th-century Lithuanian nobility
18th-century Polish nobility
19th-century Polish nobility
18th-century Polish–Lithuanian military personnel
19th-century Polish military personnel
Lithuanian generals in other armies
Polish generals in other armies